Maria Belén Tavella (born 13 December 1990), known as Belén Tavella, is an Argentine sailor. She was born in Buenos Aires, Argentina. Tavella competed in the women's 470 event at the 2020 Summer Olympics. She studied biochemistry at the University of Buenos Aires, but had to pause her postgraduate studies in 2019 to focus on yachting.

References

External links
 

1990 births
Living people
Argentine female sailors (sport)
Olympic sailors of Argentina
Sailors at the 2020 Summer Olympics – 470
Sportspeople from Buenos Aires
University of Buenos Aires alumni